Radiant One is an illusory, story-driven adventure video game with mystical elements developed by Fntastic, best known for the game The Wild Eight. Radiant One was announced on July 6, 2018.

Plot
Trying to escape from his boring life and social media, one day Daniel found a mysterious book about lucid dreams. Very quickly he was able to do incredible things, create amazing worlds and fly during sleep until one day his dreams fell under the power of something inexplicable, something terrible conceived by the Universe itself... Help Daniel survive, pass the test and get enlightenment.

Reception

Radiant One has been met with praise for its rendering of the environment and the narrative of the game.

References

External links
 

2018 video games
Adventure games
Indie video games
Windows games
Video games with Steam Workshop support
MacOS games
Single-player video games
Xbox One games
IOS games
Video games developed in Russia